The Old Protestant Cemetery is a cemetery in Santo António, Macau, China. It was established by the British East India Company in 1821 in Portuguese Macau in response to a lack of burial sites for Protestants in the Roman Catholic Portuguese colony.

It is the last resting place of the artist George Chinnery, missionaries Robert Morrison and Samuel Dyer (his wife Maria is buried at the Old Protestant Cemetery in Penang), Royal Navy captain Henry John Spencer-Churchill (son of the 5th Duke of Marlborough and great-great-grand-uncle of Winston Churchill) and US Naval Lieutenant Joseph Harod Adams (grandson of the second president of the United States, John Adams, and nephew of the sixth, John Quincy Adams). Humphrey Fleming Senhouse, a captain in the Royal Navy, is also buried here, as is John Robert Morrison, son of Robert Morrison, who was appointed as Acting Colonial Secretary of Hong Kong but died eight days later in Macau from fever. William Napier, 9th Lord Napier was buried in the cemetery but his body was subsequently exhumed and reburied in Scotland. Another grave is that of Anders Ljungstedt, a prosperous Swedish businessman, interpreter and historian.

In 2005, the cemetery  was officially enlisted as part of the UNESCO World Heritage Site Historic Center of Macau.

History 
Macau was considered by the Portuguese to be sacred Roman Catholic ground and the authorities barred the burial of Protestant within its city walls, whilst on the other side of the barrier gate the Chinese were equally as intolerant of the burial of foreigners in its soil.  This left the Protestant community of British, American and Northern European traders with the only option of a secret night-time burial in the land between the city walls and the barrier gate, and the risk of confrontation with Chinese should they be discovered, or worse, desecration of the grave once they had gone.

The matter was finally resolved in 1821 after the death of Robert Morrison's wife, Mary, when the local committee of the East India Company voted to purchase a plot of land and resolve its legal status with the Portuguese such that the burial of Protestants would be permitted there.  Later, the East India Company allowed burial of all foreigners, and several graves were moved from other locations outside the city walls into the cemetery, explaining why some graves are dated before its founding in 1821.  Nationals of Britain, the United States of America, the Netherlands, Denmark, Sweden and Germany are buried there.

The cemetery was closed in 1858, after which the cemetery began to be referred to as the "Old" Protestant Cemetery.
right|thumb|250px|Morrison Chapel
Adjoining the cemetery is the Morrison Chapel, named in honour of Robert Morrison.

See also 
 List of cemeteries in Macau
 St Michael Macau - Chapel and Cemetery (Cemitério S Miguel Arcanjo) – Catholic 1854–
 Religion in Macau

References 
 Ride, Lindsay & Ride, May, An East India Company Cemetery: Protestant Burials in Macau
 Ride, Lindsay, The Old Protestant Cemetery in Macau 
 Coates, Austin, A Macau Narrative

Further reading 
Robert Morrison, A Master Builder; Marshall Broomhall; China Inland Mission 1925
The Memoir of Samuel Dyer: Sixteen Years Missionary to the Chinese by Evan Davies, John Snow, London, 1846

External links 

 
 Morrison Chapel Website
Information about the Morrison Chapel (some information is out of date – see link below)
 Report on the appointment of a new clergy-in-charge at the Morrison Chapel
 Ola Macau Guide entry on the Old Protestant Cemetery

Historic Centre of Macau
Tourist attractions in Macau
Macau Peninsula
Christianity in Macau
Anglican cemeteries in Asia
Lutheran cemeteries
Protestant Reformed cemeteries
World Heritage Sites in China
Cemeteries in Macau
1821 establishments in China
1821 establishments in the Portuguese Empire
19th-century establishments in Macau